O14 or O-14 is an office skyscraper located in Business Bay in Dubai, United Arab Emirates. There is a 1-meter space between the facade and the windows which allows hot air to rise and cool air to come in from below. The facade is 40 cm thick and made of an extremely fluid concrete. It has 1000 circular openings of various sizes. The building is held up by the core and exoskeleton so the space inside is largely column free.
O-14 is the winner of the 2009 Silver, Emporis Skyscraper Award. O-14 also won the 2010 ACEC National Honor Award for Excellence in Engineering Design. O-14 was the recipient of the best tall building in Middle East and Africa in the best tall buildings awards by Council on Tall Buildings and Urban Habitat.

See also
Business Bay
List of tallest buildings in Dubai

References

External links
Official website
Developer's website

Office buildings completed in 2009
Skyscraper office buildings in Dubai